"Magic" is a song by Swedish duo The Sound of Arrows from their debut album Voyage.

Music video

In the video all adults disappeared and children live in their magic world.

Shot in Spain, in countryside two hours from Madrid, Oskar Gullstrand explains that it is meant to be "childlike and youthful, and true to the song. When we were thinking about the video, Stefan and I first came up for about 200 ideas for a feature film. This is meant to be the trailer for that film."

 Artist: The Sound of Arrows
 Title: Magic (Geffen)
 Director: Andreas Ohman, Oskar Gullstrand
 Production Company: Naive AB, The Look Films
 Producer: Victor Martin
 DoP: Johan Holmquist
 Art Director: Gerardo Izquierdo
 Editor: Frederika Andersson, Andreas Ohman, Oskar Gullstrand
 Illustrator: Linus Kullman, Carl-Johan Listherby
 Animator: Jonas Lindman
 Compositing: David Nalci

Track listings

CD, UK

 «Magic» – 3:17
 «Magic» (Instrumental) – 3:15

vinyl 12", UK

Side A

 «Magic»
 «Magic» (Tom Staar Remix)
 «Magic» (Chad Valley Remix)

Side B

 «Longer Ever Dream»

Personnel

Mastered By – Nigel Walton
Mixed By – Dan Grech-Marguerat
Producer – The Sound of Arrows
Producer [Additional] – Henrik Von Euler, Richard X
Written-By – S. Storm*

References

External links

 Lyrics on LyricWiki

2011 singles
The Sound of Arrows songs